Hainesville is an unincorporated community in Wood County, Texas, United States. The area around Hainesville was settled in 1845, and Christian H. Haines built a gristmill there in 1870. The Dupree post office moved to the community in 1893; it was renamed Hainesville after Haines. Hainesville had an agricultural economy; settlers primarily grew cotton but also farmed sugar cane, peanuts, melons and peaches. The town's post office closed in 1907, and its schools merged with the Mineola and Quitman districts in the 1960s. Hainesville had a population of 74 in 2000.

Climate
The climate in this area is characterized by hot, humid summers and generally mild to cool winters.  According to the Köppen Climate Classification system, Hainesville has a humid subtropical climate, abbreviated "Cfa" on climate maps.

References

Unincorporated communities in Wood County, Texas
Unincorporated communities in Texas